Gong Xiangyu (born 21 April 1997) is a Chinese volleyball player. On club level, she plays for Jiangsu.

Personal
She was born in Lianyungang to a P.E. teacher mother who was once a national épée champion, and a policeman father who used to play for the Jiangsu U23 basketball team. Her given name Xiangyu means "flying in the universe." She started attending Nanjing Normal University in 2016.

Career

Junior
Before 2014, she was a setter. As a substitute player, she participated in 2012 Asian Youth Girls Volleyball Championship and 2013 FIVB Volleyball Girls' U18 World Championship.

In 2014, because the former main opposite hitter, Ju Wanrong's injury, she began to be an opposite hitter and had success. During 2014 Asian Junior Women's Volleyball Championship and 2015 FIVB Volleyball Women's U20 World Championship, she showed her power.

Senior
She was promoted by Coach Cai Bin from the Jiangsu U23 team to Jiangsu Women's Volleyball Club in the 2015-2016 season. Following a successful debut season at the Chinese Volleyball League, she was selected by Coach Lang Ping for the national team in 2016. She represented China at the 2016 Summer Olympics and won the gold medal. She participated at the 2016 Montreux Volley Masters, 2017 Montreux Volley Masters, 2018 Montreux Volley Masters, and 2019 Montreux Volley Masters.

References

People from Lianyungang
Volleyball players from Jiangsu
Sportspeople from Jiangsu
Chinese women's volleyball players
Olympic gold medalists for China in volleyball
Volleyball players at the 2016 Summer Olympics
2016 Olympic gold medalists for China
1997 births
Living people
Opposite hitters
Setters (volleyball)
Asian Games gold medalists for China
Asian Games medalists in volleyball
Medalists at the 2018 Asian Games
Volleyball players at the 2018 Asian Games
Volleyball players at the 2020 Summer Olympics